Nong Bua Lamphu is one of Thailand's seventy-six provinces (changwat) lies in upper northeastern Thailand also called Isan. Neighbouring provinces are (from north clockwise) Udon Thani, Khon Kaen, and Loei.

Geography
Nong Bua Lamphu is in the heart of the Khorat Plateau.

National parks
There is one national park and one national park (preparation), along with five other national parks, make up region 10 (Udon Thani) of Thailand's protected areas. 
 Phu Kao–Phu Phan Kham National Park, 
 Phu Hin Chom That–Phu Phra Bat National Park,

Paleontological remains 
Chalawan, an extinct genus of crocodylin, is known solely from its holotype collected in the early-1980s from a road-cut near the town of Nong Bua Lam Phu, in the upper part of the Phu Kradung Formation. This single specimen is the most well preserved vertebrate fossil that has been found from the formation. It contains a single species, Chalawan thailandicus.

History

Nong Bua Lam Phu is famous as the spot where in the 16th century Naresuan, the king-liberator of Siam, came to learn of the outcome of a war between the Lao and Burmese in the area of Vientiane. This place was long a Lao stronghold. During the existence of the Lao Kingdom of Lan Xang (1354–1707), Nong Bua Lam Phu was traditionally given to the crown prince (Uparat) to rule. It was the birthplace of the principal wife of Chao Siribunyasan, the last independent king of Vientiane. In 1827, Chao Anou of Vientiane designated Phagna Narin to be governor at the onset of the Laotian Rebellion of 1826–1828.

Under Thai rule, the province originally consisted of five amphoe (districts) in Udon Thani province. In 1993 Udon was decentralized and a separate province of Nong Bua Lam Phu was created. It is one of the newest provinces of Thailand, together with Amnat Charoen province, Sa Kaeo province, and Bueng Kan province.

On 6 October 2022, a mass murder occurred at and near a daycare center in Uthai Sawan, a town located in the province. A total of 36 people were killed, and 10 others were injured, before the attacker committed suicide. It was the deadliest mass murder by a single perpetrator in the modern history of Thailand.

Economy
Nong Bua Lamphu is the poorest province in Thailand according to the Bangkok Post. Incomes, as of 2018, average 41,000 baht annually.

The province is largely agricultural. Sticky rice has long been the area's traditional crop, although there has been a shift to sugarcane due to low rice prices and sugarcane's resistance to flooding. In 2016, more than one third of the available agricultural land in Nong Bua Lamphu was used for sugarcane plantations. According to the provincial Office of Agricultural Economics, sugarcane cultivation is expected to rise. In contrast, the area devoted to rice farming shrunk by 73 percent from 2000 to 2016.

Symbols

Administrative divisions

Provincial government
The province is divided into six districts (amphoe). The districts are further divided into 59 subdistricts (tambon) and 636 villages (muban).
{|
|---valign=top
||
Mueang Nong Bua Lam Phu
Na Klang
Non Sang
</td>
<li>Si Bun Rueang
<li>Suwannakhuha
<li>Na Wang
|}

Local government
As of 26 November 2019 there are: one Nong Bua Lamphu Provincial Administration Organisation and 24 municipal (thesaban) areas in the province. Nong Bua Lamphu has town (thesaban mueang) status.  Further 23 subdistrict municipalities (thesaban tambon). The non-municipal areas are administered by 43 Subdistrict Administrative Organisations – SAO (ongkan borihan suan tambon).

Human achievement index 2017

Since 2003, the United Nations Development Programme (UNDP) in Thailand has tracked progress on human development at the sub-national level using the Human Achievement Index (HAI), a composite index covering eight key areas of human development. The National Economic and Social Development Board (NESDB) has taken over this task since 2017.

References

External links
Province page from the Tourist Authority of Thailand

Website of province  (Thai only)
Nong Bua Lam Phu provincial map, coat of arms and postal stamp

Isan
 
Provinces of Thailand